A sympagic environment is one where water exists mostly as a solid, ice, such as a polar ice cap or glacier. Solid sea ice is permeated with channels filled with salty brine. These briny channels and the sea ice itself have its ecology, referred to as "sympagic ecology".

Residents of temperate or tropical climates often assume, mistakenly, that ice and snow are devoid of life. In fact, a number of varieties of algae such as diatoms engage in photosynthesis in arctic and alpine regions of Earth. Other energy sources include Aeolian dust and pollen swept in from other regions. These ecosystems also include bacteria and fungi, as well as animals like flatworms and crustaceans.  A number of sympagic worm species are commonly called ice worms. 

Additionally, the ocean has abundant plankton, and prolific algal blooms occur in the polar regions each summer as well as in high mountain lakes, bringing nutrients to those parts of the ice in contact with the water. In the Arctic Ocean, ice algae accounts for close to half of the primary production during the summer months.

In the spring, krill can scrape off the green lawn of ice algae from the underside of the pack ice.

See also
Polynya

References

External links
"Studies on the Arctic pack-ice habitat and sympagic meiofauna – seasonal and regional variabilities", Henrike Schünemann, University of Kiel, dissertation, 2004
The Arctic: Ocean of Ice
Antarctic life
Glaciology

Aquatic ecology
Water ice
Subfields of ecology